The Rumely–Des Moines Drug Company Building at 110 SW. Fourth St. in Des Moines, Iowa is a large brick warehouse block building.  It is a work of architects Hallett & Rawson.  It has also been known as the Rumely Bldg, as the Federal Machine Corp Bldg, and as the Security File Warehouse Building.  It was listed on the National Register of Historic Places in 1989.

References

Buildings and structures in Des Moines, Iowa
National Register of Historic Places in Des Moines, Iowa
Commercial buildings on the National Register of Historic Places in Iowa
Chicago school architecture in Iowa